Stannabenzene (C5H6Sn) is the parent representative of a group of organotin compounds that are related to benzene with a carbon atom replaced by a tin atom. Stannabenzene itself has been studied by computational chemistry, but has not been isolated.

Stable derivatives of stannabenzene
Stable derivatives of stannabenzene have been isolated. The 2-stannanaphthalene depicted below is stable in an inert atmosphere at temperatures below 140 °C. The tin to carbon bond in this compound is shielded from potential reactants by two very bulky groups, one tert-butyl group and the even larger 2,4,6-tris[bis(trimethylsilyl)methyl]phenyl or Tbt group. The two Sn-C bonds have bond lengths of 202.9 and 208.1 pm which are shorter than those for Sn-C single bonds (214 pm) and comparable to that of known Sn=C double bonds (201.6 pm). The C-C bonds show little variation with bond lengths between 135.6 and 144.3 pm signaling that this compound is aromatic.

Tbt-substituted 9-stannaphenanthrene was reported in 2005. At room temperature it forms the [4+2] cycloadduct.

Tbt-substituted stannabenzene was reported in 2010. At room-temperature it quantitatively forms the DA dimer.

See also
 6-membered aromatic rings with one carbon replaced by another group: borabenzene, silabenzene, germabenzene, stannabenzene, pyridine, phosphorine, arsabenzene, bismabenzene, pyrylium, thiopyrylium, selenopyrylium, telluropyrylium

References

Tin heterocycles
Six-membered rings
Hypothetical chemical compounds
Tin(IV) compounds